The .x file extension was introduced with DirectX 2.0 to contain files of the X file format; and DirectX 6.0 introduced methods that enable reading from and writing to .x files.

It is a simple file containing geometry meshes and material information that can be viewed in the DirectX Viewer, a program available with the 2008 DirectX June SDK (Software Development Kit).  Because the SDK provided the means to load and save assets in this format, it was often used as a simple way of getting assets into and out of game programs.  As of 2014, the file format has been deprecated for a long time

and the interchange role is better served by a more modern format like Autodesk FBX.

See also 
 dotXSI - an extended format of X file format

References 

DirectX
Graphics file formats